The following highways are numbered 678:

Canada

United States